Dam Tang-e Chahen (also Romanized as Dam Tang-e Chāhen; also known as Damtang-e Shāhīn) is a village in Olya Tayeb Rural District, in the Central District of Landeh County, Kohgiluyeh and Boyer-Ahmad Province, Iran. At the 2006 census, its population was 47, in 9 families.

References 

Populated places in Landeh County